The World Figure Skating Championships is an annual figure skating competition sanctioned by the International Skating Union in which figure skaters compete for the title of World Champion.

The 1959 competitions for men, ladies, pair skating, and ice dancing took place in Colorado Springs, Colorado, USA.

Results

Men

Judges:
 E. Kucharz 
 Donald H. Gilchrist 
 P. Baron 
 Theo Klemm 
 Pamela Davis 
 M. Enderlin 
 R. Sackett

Ladies

Judges:
 Oscar Madl 
 P. Devine 
 Theo Klemm 
 Pamela Davis 
 Grazia Barcellona 
 Benedict-Stieber 
 A. Krupy

Pairs

Judges:
 Oscar Madl 
 Donald H. Gilchrist 
 P. Baron 
 Theo Klemm 
 Pamela Davis 
 Grazia Barcellona 
 Benedict-Stieber 
 M. Enderlin 
 R. Sackett

Ice dancing

Judges:
 Edwin Kucharz 
 P. Devine 
 J. Meudec 
 A. D. C. Cordon 
 Harold Hartshorne

Sources
 Result List provided by the ISU

World Figure Skating Championships
World Figure Skating Championships
International figure skating competitions hosted by the United States
World Figure Skating Championships
Sports competitions in Colorado Springs, Colorado
1950s in Colorado Springs, Colorado
World Figure Skating Championships